Guia Lopes da Laguna is a municipality located in the Brazilian state of Mato Grosso do Sul. Its population was 9,824 (2020) and its area is 1,210 km².

References

Municipalities in Mato Grosso do Sul